Continental championship may refer to:

 African Championship
 Asian Championship
 European Championship
 Oceania Championship
 Pan American Championship
 North American Championship
 South American Championship

See also
 2012 Continental Championships (disambiguation)
 Central American Championships (disambiguation)
 Continental football championships, association football
 Continental Youth Championship, Gaelic football, hurling, and camogie 
 SCCA Continental Championship, auto racing series
 World championship

 *
Sports terminology